The Teatro della Pergola is an historic opera house in Florence, Italy. It is located in the centre of the city on the Via della Pergola, from which the theatre takes its name. It was built in 1656 under the patronage of Cardinal Gian Carlo de' Medici to designs by the architect Ferdinando Tacca, son of the sculptor Pietro Tacca; its inaugural production was the opera buffa, Il potestà di Colognole by Jacopo Melani. The opera house, the first to be built with superposed tiers of boxes rather than raked semi-circular seating in the Roman fashion, is considered to be the oldest in Italy, having occupied the same site for more than 350 years.

It has two auditoria, the 'Sala Grande', with 1,500 seats, and the 'Saloncino', a former ballroom located upstairs which has been used as a recital hall since 1804 and which seats 400. 

Work on completing the interior was finished in 1661, in time for the celebration of the wedding of the future grand duke Cosimo III de' Medici, with the court spectacle Ercole in Tebe by Giovanni Antonio Boretti. Primarily a court theatre used by the Grand Dukes of Tuscany, it was only after 1718 that it was opened to the public. In this theatre the great operas of Mozart were heard for the first time in Italy, and Donizetti’s Parisina and Rosmonda d'Inghilterra, Verdi’s Macbeth (1847) and Mascagni’s I Rantzau were given their premiere productions.

By the nineteenth century, La Pergola was performing operas of the best-known composers of the day including Vincenzo Bellini, Gaetano Donizetti and Giuseppe Verdi. Verdi's Macbeth was given its premiere performance at the Pergola in 1847.

The Pergola's present appearance dates from an 1855–57 remodelling; it has the traditional horseshoe-shaped auditorium with three rings of boxes and topped with a gallery.  It seats 1,000. It was declared a national monument in 1925 and has been restored at least twice since.

Today the theatre presents a broad range of about 250 drama performances each year, ranging from Molière to Neil Simon. Opera is only presented there during the annual Maggio Musicale Fiorentino.

Tommaso Sacchi is the Chairman of Fondazione Teatro della Toscana - Teatro della Pergola.

References
Notes

Sources
 Lynn, Karyl Charna, Italian Opera Houses and Festivals, Lanham, Maryland: The Scarecrow Press, Inc., 2005.  
 Plantamura, Carol, The Opera Lover's Guide to Europe, New York: Citadel Press, 1996.

External links
 Teatro della Pergola's official website
  Includes interior photograph
"Amici della Musica" regularly organize classical concerts, usually on Saturday and Sunday in the afternoon, at Teatro della Pergola

Opera houses in Italy
Theatres in Florence
Theatres completed in 1656
Music venues completed in 1656
Opera in Florence